The Russian Second Division 2007 was the third strongest Division in Russian football. The Second Division is geographically divided into 5 zones. 
The winners of each zone are automatically promoted into the First Division. The bottom finishers of each zone lose professional status and are relegated into the Amateur Football League.

South

Standings

Top scorers
22 goals

 Karen Sargsyan (FC Dynamo Stavropol)

17 goals

 Ivan Luzhnikov (FC Chernomorets Novorossiysk)

16 goals

 Vladimir Shipilov (FC Chernomorets Novorossiysk)

14 goals

 Vladimir Serov (FC Rotor Volgograd)
 Georgi Smurov (FC Taganrog)

13 goals
Ivan Grinyuk (FC Bataysk-2007)
Dmitry Mezinov (FC Bataysk-2007)

12 goals

 Zhumaldin Karatlyashev (FC Kavkaztransgaz-2005 Ryzdvyany)
 Ilya Kokorev (FC Sochi-04)

11 goals

 Mikhail Surshkov (FC Druzhba Maykop)

West

Standings

Top scorers
16 goals

 Aleksei Baranov (FC Torpedo-RG Moscow)

14 goals

 Maksim Protserov (FC Spartak Shchyolkovo)
 Ruslan Suanov (FC Dynamo St. Petersburg / FC Sportakademklub Moscow)

13 goals

 Ruslan Elderkhanov (FC Reutov)

11 goals
Maksim Andreyev (FC Zenit-2 St. Petersburg)

10 goals
Grigory Gnedov (FC Sheksna Cherepovets)
Azamat Gonezhukov (FC Nara-Desna Naro-Fominsk)
Dmitry Kalinin (FC Sheksna Cherepovets)
Valeri Malyshev (FC Torpedo Vladimir)

9 goals

 Igor Vekovishchev (FC Zelenograd)
 Sergei Rodin (FC Sportakademklub Moscow)
 Artur Sarkisov (FC Reutov)

Center

Standings

Top scorers
17 goals

 Denis Zhukovskiy (FC Metallurg Lipetsk)

15 goals

 Roman Grigoryan (FC Vityaz Podolsk)

12 goals

 Sergei Anokhin (FC Vityaz Podolsk)
 Vladislav Mayorov (FC Ryazan)

11 goals

 Aleksei Antonnikov (FC Lukhovitsy)
 Vladimir Konstantinov (FC Lokomotiv Liski)
 Aleksandr Kutyin (FC Yelets)

10 goals

 Dmitri Bayda (FC Metallurg Lipetsk)
 Dmitri Chesnokov (FC Vityaz Podolsk)
 Andrei Meshchaninov (FC Saturn Yegoryevsk / FC Zvezda Serpukhov)
 Fyodor Milovanov (FC Dynamo Voronezh)
 Rafael Zangionov (FC Metallurg Lipetsk)

Ural-Povolzhye

Standings

Top scorers
17 goals

 Dmitri Ryzhov (FC Krylia Sovetov-SOK Dimitrovgrad)

15 goals

 Vladimir Morozov (FC Zenit Chelyabinsk)

14 goals

 Mikhail Tyufyakov (FC Dynamo Kirov)

12 goals

 Marat Shogenov (FC Gazovik Orenburg)
 Dmitri Zarva (FC Tyumen)

11 goals

 Konstantin Kaynov (FC Lada Togliatti / FC Volga Nizhny Novgorod)

10 goals

 Sergei Yevin (FC Lada Togliatti / FC Volga Ulyanovsk)

9 goals

 Dmitri Bushmanov (FC Zenit Chelyabinsk)
 Sergei Perednya (FC Volga Nizhny Novgorod)

8 goals

 Valeri Lobanovskiy (FC Zenit Chelyabinsk)
 Stanislav Prokofyev (FC Tyumen)
 Maksim Samoylov (FC SOYUZ-Gazprom Izhevsk)

East

Standings

Top scorers
19 goals

 Yevgeni Ragoza (FC Dynamo Barnaul)

14 goals

 Aleksei Tikhonkikh (FC Chita)

12 goals

 Anton Bagayev (FC Irtysh-1946 Omsk)
 Yevgeni Nosov (FC Smena Komsomolsk-na-Amure)
 Anton Sidelnikov (FC Chita)

11 goals

 Vladislav Aksyutenko (FC Dynamo Barnaul)
 Nikolai Sergiyenko (FC Amur Blagoveshchensk)

9 goals

 Aleksei Bazanov (FC Metallurg Krasnoyarsk)

8 goals

 Yevgeni Kachan (FC Metallurg Krasnoyarsk)
 Andrei Smyshlyayev (FC Sibiryak Bratsk)
 Vitali Trofimov (FC Zarya Leninsk-Kuznetsky)

3
Russian Second League seasons
Russia
Russia